Chijo is a Chilean town. It is a few kilometers east of Cariquima, in the Tarapacá Region, Chile. It is located in the Commune of Colchane. It is a small town of houses with a wild thatched roof and a small church dating from the 18th century. Quinoa, broad beans and quinces are grown in the town, in addition to the typical potato plantation.

References 

Populated places in Tarapacá Region
Communes of Chile